Hoffellsjökull is an outlet glacier which flows from the ice cap of Vatnajökull. It is located in the municipality of Hornafjörður, southeast Iceland. Hoffellsjökull takes its name from Hoffell; a mountainous area and a farmland. Hoffellsjökull and the Hoffell area are a part of Vatnajökull National Park.

Geomorphology 

A cold period, often named the Little Ice Age, begun around 1450. The outlet glacier Hoffellsjökull began to advance from the Vatnajökull ice cap, over level and vegetated land. 
 
When the Hoffellsjökull glacier tongue advanced, it blocked the lower openings of gorges in the mountains around Hoffellsfjöll and Núpar. Glacial lakes formed at Efstafellsvatn, Gjávatn and Múlavatn, and annual jökulhlaups (glacial outburst floods) occurred. When the glacier retreated the dams were removed and the lakes had disappeared by 1985. The old water levels can still be clearly seen, for example at the site of Gjávatn where the water was up to 60 m deep.

Utilization 

Hoffellsjökull was largest around 1890 and for the next fifty years it reached the moraine ridge in front of it. Lorries used to be driven up onto this ridge, and filled with glacial ice which they transported to the town of Höfn. The ice was used for chilling fish, both onshore and at sea. Due to climate changes, Hoffellsjökull has retreated a considerable distance. A deep lake is rapidly developing in the depression left behind, and will become constantly larger as the glacier retreats.

Research 

The Hoffellsjökull outlet glacier was the scene of extensive research by glaciologists in the early part of the 20th century. It was also used as an access point for research on the Vatnajökull ice cap. One of the most famous expeditions was directed by the Icelandic meteorologist Jón Eyþórsson and the Swedish glaciologist Hans Wilhelmsson Ahlmann in 1936. Two geography students who accompanied them later became well known: Carl Mannerfelt in Swedish business and Sigurður Þórarinsson in Icelandic geological research.

Studies carried out by this group demonstrated that Vatnajökull receives much more precipitation than most glaciers elsewhere in the world, and also produces more meltwater. This means that the water cycle on the south side of Vatnajökull is extremely rapid, greater than in most other glacial systems in the world. Indeed, the central part of Hoffellsjökull was shown by other measurements to achieve a sliding speed of about two metres per day, with recent research confirming this speed.

References

Glaciers of Iceland
Populated places in Eastern Region (Iceland)